Michele Zappella  (born 4 March 1936) is an Italian psychiatrist and scholar of Child Neuropsychiatry. He is a native of Viareggio, Italy.

Professional background 
Zappella graduated in 1960 in Medicine and Surgery in Rome, Italy. He initially relocated to London, where he worked with the Fountain Hospital of London from 1961 to 1963. He then moved back to Rome, where he worked in the medical field and specialized in Pediatrics. As winner of a Fulbright grant for the United States, he became a Fellow of Neurology in the Department of Child Neurology at Children's Hospital in Washington D.C., serving there from 1964 to 1965. In 1966, he moved to Pisa, Italy, where he specialized first in Child Neuropsychiatry and then, in 1968, in Nervous and Mental Diseases. In 1970 he became Lecturer in Mental Health.

He was head of the Department of Child Neuropsychiatry of Siena Hospital from 1973 to 2006. , he is teaching Child Neuropsychiatry in the Schools of Specialization of the University of Siena and serves as a consultant in the Rett Center of Versilia Hospital in Italy.

Zappella is an honorary member of the Society for the Study of Behavioural Phenotypes in London and of the Italian Society of Pedagogy. He was the President of the Italian Society of Tourette's Syndrome from 1999 to 2003, and Vice President of the Italian Society of Child Neuropsychiatry from 1976 to 1978.

He has been involved in social integration and education of disabled children. From 1969 through 1970, he was focused on publishing the first papers on this subject.

In the 1960s, Zappella studied the Placing Reflex  and its connections with the early diagnosis of severe mental retardation. His studies on Rett Syndrome have shown that there is a milder variant of this syndrome in which children acquire late some manual skills and spoken language. This variant is known as the Zappella Variant of Rett Syndrome (OMIM) in the scientific community.

Zappella has extensively studied Autistic Disorders, discovering the Dysmaturational Syndrome, which manifests as a transitional autistic behavior, associated with motor and vocal tics, which has a genetic cause Tourette-like, quite different from stable Autistic Disorders. He introduced a form of rehabilitative therapy, known as Emotional Activation through Body Reciprocity (AERC).

In 1981, in recognition of his studies on Autism, Zappella received the Gold Medal and the Honorary Citizenship of the town of Sesto San Giovanni, Italy.

Published works 
Zappella is the author of over 300 scientific publications, 105 indexed on PubMed - U.S. National Library of Medicine of National Institutes of Health. In 1980, he won the Glaxo Award for Science diffusion (Verona - Italy). He is currently Scientific Director of the magazine Autismo e Disturbi dello Sviluppo.

Italian

 Zappella, Michele. Le encefalopatie congenite del neonato e del lattante, Infanzia Anormale, 11, 1967.
 Zappella, Michele. Il Pesce Bambino, Milano: Feltrinelli, 1976. ; translated in French, l'Enfant Poisson, Paris: Payot, 1979. .
 Zappella, Michele. Il Bambino nella Luna, Milano: Feltrinelli, 1979. .
 Zappella, Michele. Non vedo, non sento, non parlo, Milano: Mondadori, 1984; translated in Spanish, No veo, no oigo, no ablo, Paidos Terapia Familial, 1992. .
 Zappella, Michele. I bambini autistici, l’holding e la famiglia, Roma: Nuova Italia Scientifica, 1987. .
 A.A.V.V.  Metodo Portage, ed. italiana a cura di Michele Zappella, Torino: Omega, 1989. .
 Zappella, Michele. Autismo Infantile, Roma: Carocci, 1996. ; translated in Spanish, Autismo Infantìl, Instituto de Cultura Economica: Mexico, 1998. .
 Zappella, Michele; with Dario Ianes. Facciamo il punto su l'autismo, Trento: Erickson, 2009. .

English

 Zappella, Michele; with Alberto Oliverio. The behavior of human infants, New York: Plenum Press, 1983. .
 Zappella, Michele; cooperated to Mary Coleman's The Neurology of Autism, New York: Oxford University Press, 2005. .

References

Biographical notes sources
 Anagrafe - Università di Roma La Sapienza - Roma, Italy
 Albo Ufficiale di Ateneo - Università di Pisa - Pisa, Italy
 Anagrafe della Ricerca - Università degli Studi di Siena - Siena, Italy
 Sede A.I.S.T. - Associazione Italiana Sindrome di Tourette – Milano, Italy
 Direttivo SINPIA - Società Italiana di Neuropsichiatria Infantile - Milano, Italy
 Comune di Sesto San Giovanni - Sesto San Giovanni, (MI) Italy

External links
 Michele Zappella homepage

Italian psychiatrists
1936 births
Living people
People from Viareggio
People from Siena
Academic staff of the University of Siena